Edmond Haxhinasto (born 16 November 1966) is an Albanian politician who was Deputy Prime Minister of Albania from 2011 to 2013.

Early life and  education
Edmond Haxhinasto was born in Tirana on 16 November 1966. Haxhinasto graduated from the University of Tirana, Faculty of History and Philology, English Chair in 1989 with a Diploma in English. His postgraduate education includes a Master of Business Administration from the International Executive Center, Brdo, Slovenia in 1996. In 2000, he completed a Master of Public Policy from the Woodrow Wilson School of Public and International Affairs at Princeton University.

Career
After a brief engagement in educational and national youth organizations, worked as Head of Foreign Relations at the Parliament of the Republic of Albania from September 1991 to July 1992. From 1993 to 1997 was engaged in the private sector. From August 1997- July 1999 served at the Office of the Prime Minister as Head of Coordination Department. He was also Government Representative for the Emergency Management Group set up to manage the situation of Kosovan refugees in Albania. In 1998, was Chair of the Anti-Corruption Monitoring Group in charge of monitoring the implementation of the Government’s plan to combat corruption in Albania.

Foreign Minister
On 16 September 2010, Haxhinasto was appointed Minister of Foreign Affairs. On 29 March 2011, Haxhinasto attended the London Conference on Libya.

Albanian Ministry of Foreign Affairs

Timeline
 From July 2000 to October 2001 served as Diplomatic Advisor to the Prime Minister.
 From November 2001 to July 2002 served as Charge d’ Affairs e.p. at the Albanian Embassy in Belgrade.
 From August 2002 – September 2003 worked as Chief of Cabinet at the Ministry of Foreign Affairs.
 From April 2004 to May 2005 was Advisor to Mr. Ilir Meta, in his capacity as Member of the International Commission on the Balkans.
 In February 2004 became Co-Founder of the Institute for Peace, Development and Integration.
 From 2004 has held the post of International Secretary, Head of National Committee and Vice-Chairman of the Socialist Movement for Integration (LSI).
 From October 2009 to September 2010 served as Deputy Minister of Public Works and Transport.
 From 16 September 2010 to 2012 he held the post of Minister of Foreign Affairs. 
 From 17 January 2011 to 4 April 2013 he held the position of the Deputy Prime Minister and Minister of Foreign Affairs.
 From 15 September 2013 to 9 September 2016 he held the position of Minister of Transportation and Infrastructure.

Notes

References

1966 births
Living people
Politicians from Tirana
Albanian diplomats
Government ministers of Albania
Foreign ministers of Albania
University of Tirana alumni
Princeton School of Public and International Affairs alumni
Socialist Movement for Integration politicians